Tollerford Hundred was a hundred in the county of Dorset, England, containing the following parishes:

Chilfrome
East Chelborough
Evershot
Frome St Quintin
Frome Vauchurch
Maiden Newton
Melbury Sampford
Rampisham
Toller Fratrum
Toller Porcorum (part)
West Chelborough
Wynford Eagle

See also
List of hundreds in Dorset

Sources
Boswell, Edward, 1833: The Civil Division of the County of Dorset (published on CD by Archive CD Books Ltd, 1992)
Hutchins, John, History of Dorset, vols 1-4 (3rd ed 1861–70; reprinted by EP Publishing, Wakefield, 1973)
Mills, A. D., 1977, 1980, 1989: Place Names of Dorset, parts 1–3. English Place Name Society: Survey of English Place Names vols LII, LIII and 59/60

Hundreds of Dorset